Jong Myong-suk (born 1993) is a wrestler from North Korea. She won the bronze medal the 2014 World Wrestling Championships, 2015 World Wrestling Championships and 2018 World Wrestling Championships.

References

External links 
 

Living people
North Korean female sport wrestlers
Year of birth missing (living people)
Place of birth missing (living people)
World Wrestling Championships medalists
Wrestlers at the 2016 Summer Olympics
Olympic wrestlers of North Korea
Wrestlers at the 2018 Asian Games
Asian Games medalists in wrestling
Asian Games gold medalists for North Korea
Medalists at the 2018 Asian Games
21st-century North Korean women